Liam Broady and Tom Farquharson were the defending champions but Farquharson was no longer eligible to compete as a Junior. Broady competed with Filip Horanský and lost in the semifinals to George Morgan and Mate Pavić.

Morgan and Pavić defeated Oliver Golding and Jiří Veselý in the final, 3–6, 6–4, 7–5 to win the boys' doubles tennis title at the 2011 Wimbledon Championships.

Seeds

  Oliver Golding /  Jiří Veselý (final)
  George Morgan /  Mate Pavić (champions)
  Andrés Artuñedo /  Roberto Carballés Baena (semifinals)
  Liam Broady /  Filip Horanský (semifinals)
  Thiago Monteiro /  Bruno Sant'Anna (first round)
  Hugo Dellien /  Diego Hidalgo (second round)
  Luke Saville /  João Pedro Sorgi (first round)
  Mate Delić /  Dominic Thiem (first round)

Draw

Finals

Top half

Bottom half

References

External links

Boys' Doubles
Wimbledon Championship by year – Boys' doubles